Alfonso Bermyn (3 January 1853 – 16 February 1915) was a Belgian Catholic priest, missionary, and Bishop of the Roman Catholic Archdiocese of Suiyuan between 1901 and 1915.

Biography
Alfonso Bermyn was born in St. Paul de Waes, Belgium, on 3 January 1853. He was ordained a priest on 10 June 1876. He joined the CICM Missionaries on 4 March 1878. He went to Mongolia to preach in the same year. In April 1901, the Holy See appointed him as Bishop of the Roman Catholic Archdiocese of Suiyuan to replace Ferdinand Hamer, who died in the Boxer Rebellion last year. He was consecrated on 26 January 1902.

He died on 16 February 1915, aged 62.

References

1853 births
1915 deaths
20th-century Belgian Roman Catholic priests
20th-century Roman Catholic bishops in China